The 1976 Charlotte Tennis Classic, also known by its sponsored name North Carolina National Bank Tennis Classic,  was a men's tennis tournament played on outdoor clay courts that was part of the World Championship Tennis (WCT) circuit. It was the sixth edition of the tournament and was held from April 13 through April 18, 1976 at the Julian J. Clark Tennis Stadium, owned by the Olde Providence Racquet Club in Charlotte, North Carolina in the United States. Tony Roche won the singles title.

Finals

Singles
 Tony Roche defeated  Vitas Gerulaitis 6–3, 3–6, 6–1
 It was Roche's 1st singles title of the year and the 8th of his career in the open era.

Doubles
 Tony Roche /  John Newcombe defeated  Vitas Gerulaitis /  Gene Mayer 6–3, 7–5

References

External links
 ITF tournament edition details

Charlotte Tennis Classic
Charlotte Tennis Classic
Charlotte Tennis Classic
Charlotte Tennis Classic